John Robert Winder Neill (born 17 December 1945) was the Church of Ireland Archbishop of Dublin until the end of January 2011.

The fourth generation of his family to become a clergyman, John Neill was educated in Dublin at the Avoca School and at  Sandford Park. He attended the University of Dublin (Trinity College) studying Hebrew and oriental languages winning a scholarship in 1965 and graduating in 1966. He subsequently studied at Jesus College and Ridley Hall, Cambridge. He became a deacon in 1969, a priest in 1970, and a bishop in 1986.

Affiliations
 Member, Governing Body of University College Galway (1986–97)
 Academic Council of the Irish School of Ecumenics
 President, Council of Churches for Britain and Ireland (1990–94)
 President of Churches Together in Britain and Ireland (1999–2002)
 Anglican Chairman of Porvoo Contact Group since 1998
 Member, Central Committee of the World Council of Churches

At the Lambeth Conference in 1988 he proposed all the approved resolutions in respect of Women in the Episcopate and was chairman of the Church of Ireland General Synod Committee on Ordination of Women (1988–91). He has served on many central committees of the Church of Ireland covering issues such as liturgical reform, education, communications, ministry, Christian unity and synodical structures. He was co-founder and chairman of the Church of Ireland/Methodist Church Joint Theological Working Party.

Family
Neill and his wife Betty have three sons:

 The Reverend Canon Stephen Neill, Rector of Cloughjordan, County Tipperary
 Andrew Neill, a member of the Garda Síochána
 Peter Neill, a photographer

Pastoral ministry positions

 1969–1971: Curate of St Paul's Glenageary, Dublin
 1971–1974: Bishop's Vicar, Diocesan Registrar and Librarian, St Canice's Cathedral, Ossory
 1974–1978: Incumbent of Abbeystrewry Union (Ross)
 1978–1984: St Bartholomew's with Christ Church, Leeson Park (Dublin)
 1984–1986: Archdeacon of Waterford
 1986–1997: Bishop of Tuam, Killalla and Achonry
 1997–2002: Bishop of Cashel and Ossory (Elected 23 April 1997; consecrated later that month)
 2002–2011: Archbishop of Dublin, Bishop of Glendalough, Primate of Ireland, and Metropolitan (Elected on 29 August 2002)

References

External links
 Profile of John Neill
 United Diocese of Dublin and Glendalough
 Church of Ireland
 Christ Church Cathedral, Dublin
 St Patrick's Cathedral, Dublin

 

1945 births
Living people
People from County Dublin
People educated at Sandford Park School
Alumni of Trinity College Dublin
Irish Anglicans
Bishops of Tuam, Killala, and Achonry
Anglican archbishops of Dublin
Archdeacons of Waterford
People associated with the University of Galway
Alumni of Jesus College, Cambridge
Alumni of Ridley Hall, Cambridge
Scholars of Trinity College Dublin